Adaora Alise Adimora is an American doctor and academic. She is the Sarah Graham Kenan Distinguished Professor of Medicine and professor of epidemiology at the University of North Carolina School of Medicine. Her research centers on the transmission of HIV, as well as other sexually transmitted infections (STIs), among minority populations. Her work has highlighted the importance of social determinants of HIV transmission and the need for structural interventions to reduce risk. In 2019, she became an elected member of the National Academy of Medicine in recognition of her contributions.

Education and early career 
Adimora was raised in Manhattan. Her mother was a nurse administrator and her father was a physician. She attended Cornell University, where she received her Bachelor of Arts degree in 1977. She then attended Yale University School of Medicine, where she received her Doctor of Medicine in 1981. She began her internship in Internal Medicine at Boston City Hospital. When she began medical school, she was initially interested in becoming a psychiatrist, but following her internship, decided to complete her residency in Infectious Diseases. She subsequently moved to New York City to complete her fellowship at Montefiore Medical Center/Albert Einstein College of Medicine in 1986, and went on to become a physician at Harlem Hospital Center's Division of Infectious Diseases.

In 1993, she completed her Master of Public Health in epidemiology from UNC Gillings School of Global Public Health.

Research and career 
In 1989, Adimora became a Clinical Assistant Professor of Medicine at the University of North Carolina at Chapel Hill. In 2003, she became the first black woman in the University of North Carolina's Infectious Diseases division to receive tenure.

Research 
Adimora's research program centers on understanding patterns of HIV/AIDS transmission among heterosexual African Americans and has highlighted the role economic and social forces play in the HIV epidemic. In her work, she highlights the importance of sexual network patterns on the spread of the infection. In a 2007 study, she used data from the National Survey of Family Growth, in which a cohort of nearly 5,000 men reported their sexual activity, and found that approximately one in ten men have concurrent sexual partners, which can increase the rate at which sexually transmitted infections like HIV can spread.

Adimora has also applied her research expertise towards developing evidence-based policy solutions to prevent the spread of HIV. In 2018, she developed a proposal to change the way clinical trials for HIV prevention are approached among populations who have lower incidence of the infection. Randomized clinical trials, which require thousands of participants, are the gold standard for determining a treatment's effectiveness. However, if the number of people who have a particular condition is low, as with conditions that affect minority populations, conducting randomized clinical trials is not possible. For such cases, Adimora and her colleagues proposed a new method to estimate the effectiveness of drugs by combining clinical and pharmacological data from traditional clinical trials with those collected from smaller studies.

Leadership 
Adimora is the principal investigator of the UNC site of the Women's Interagency HIV Study (WIHS), which seeks to understand the impact of HIV in women with funding primarily from various Institutes of the National Institutes of Health.

Adimora formerly served on the Presidential Advisory Council on HIV/AIDS, which is tasked with advising the United States Secretary of Health and Human Services on strategies to prevent HIV and promote treatment. Notably, Adimora remained on the Council even after six members exited in June 2017, expressing frustrations with President Donald Trump's healthcare policies. In an interview, she told BuzzFeed News: "I decided to stay on because I thought that for me it would be best to use my voice from within the council to try to favorably impact policies that affect people with and at risk for HIV, health care providers, and public health." She was, however, openly critical of the administration's healthcare policies, co-authoring an opinion editorial warning that the proposed American Health Care Act of 2017 (which never passed) would lead to the unnecessary deaths of Americans, leaving the poorest Americans uninsured. In August 2017, the Council wrote a letter to Tom Price, who was then Secretary of Health and Human Services, outlining the impact of repealing the Affordable Health Care Act on HIV prevention.

Adimora also formerly served as the chair of the HIV Medical Association, an organization of medical professionals who practice HIV medicine. During her tenure as chair, Turing Pharmaceuticals, the company founded by Martin Shkreli, increased the price of a drug called Daraprim by over 4000 percent. The drug is used to treat the parasitic infection toxoplasmosis, which can be severe for patients with compromised immune systems and for pregnant women. Adimora co-authored a letter to the pharmaceutical company advising they revise their pricing strategy for the drug, urging the company to "help [them] improve public health by immediately implementing a rational and fair pricing strategy." In March 2016, she testified in front of the United States Senate's Special Committee on Aging about the consequences of such drug price increases on vulnerable populations who cannot afford the drugs they need.

Awards and honors 
In 2009, Adimora was named one of the top 100 African American leaders by The Root. She received the  Mary Turner Lane Award in 2011. She was elected a member of the National Academy of Medicine in 2019.

References 

Living people
People from Manhattan
Physicians from New York City
Scientists from New York City
American women epidemiologists
American epidemiologists
American women physicians
Yale School of Medicine alumni
Cornell University alumni
Year of birth missing (living people)
UNC Gillings School of Global Public Health alumni
American women academics
21st-century American women
Members of the National Academy of Medicine
University of North Carolina School of Medicine faculty